The Mirror (Spanish:El Espejo) is a 1943 Argentine drama film directed by Francisco Múgica and starring Mirtha Legrand, Roberto Airaldi and Alicia Barrié.

Cast

External links
 

1943 films
1940s Spanish-language films
Argentine black-and-white films
Films directed by Francisco Múgica
Argentine drama films
1943 drama films
1940s Argentine films